is a hot spring resort in the city of Awara, Fukui Prefecture, Japan.

History
The history of Awara Onsen is relatively short. In 1883, a farmer digging an irrigation well hit an 80-degree C saline hot spring. By the following year, several onsen hotels had already opened and attracted visitors for especially for long-term health care. With the opening of the Japanese Government Railways Mikuni Line in 1911 and the Keifuku Electric Railway Mikuni Ishihara Line (currently the Echizen Railway Mikuni Awara Line) in 1928, the area developed rapidly. However, the area suffered great damage in 1948 Fukui earthquake, and most of its historic buildings were lost in a great fire of 1956.

The onsen hotels were rebuilt with modern materials afterwards, and the onsen remains a popular tourist designation for visitors especially from the Kansai region and Chubu regions of Japan. Awara Onsen does not have joint management of the hot springs. Each hotel has several hot spring wells. For this reason, each hotel has hot springs with different elements,

External links
  
Awara City Tourist Cooperative site 

Hot springs of Fukui Prefecture
Tourist attractions in Fukui Prefecture
Spa towns in Japan
Awara, Fukui